The Green Disc is a promotional album by Midnight Oil that was released in 1990 under the CBS label.

Track listing
 King of the Mountain - 3:51
 Brave Faces - 4:46
 No Time for Games - 4:33
 The Dead Heart - Long Version - 6:07
 Kosciusko - 4:40
 Don't Wanna Be the One - 3:02
 Power and the Passion - Remix - 6:43
 No Reaction - 2:57
 Powderworks - 5:37
 Best of Both Worlds - 4:04
 Beds Are Burning - Tamarama Mix - 8:02
 Gunbarrel Highway - 3:40
 Hercules - 4:28
 Blue Sky Mine - Food on the Table Mix - 6:34
 Stand in Line (Live) - 5:52

Personnel
 Peter Garrett - lead vocals
 Peter Gifford - bass, vocals (all tracks except 1, 8, 9 and 14)
 Bones Hillman - bass, vocals (tracks 1 and 14)
 Andrew James - bass, vocals (tracks 8 and 9)
 Robert Hirst - drums, vocals
 Martin Rotsey - guitars, vocals
 Jim Moginie - guitars, keyboards, vocals

External links
 Midnight Oil
 Album Details

1990 compilation albums
Midnight Oil compilation albums
Promotional albums